The National Taiwan Symphony Orchestra (NTSO), founded in 1945, is the oldest symphony orchestra in Taiwan. It is based in Wufeng, Taichung.

Conductors

Principle Guest Conductor 
 Lan Shui (首席客席指揮:水藍), 2019-present

Past Conductors 
 Fusao Kajima (梶間聡夫), 2009
 Chiu Chun-chiang (邱君強), 2006–2009

General Directors 
 Tsai Chih-kue (蔡繼琨)1945-1949
 Wang Shin-chi (王錫奇)1949-1960
 Day Tsuei-lung (戴粹倫)1960-1973
 Shin Wei-liang (史惟亮)1973-1974
 Deng Han-chin (鄧漢錦)1974-1991
 Chen Tscheng-Hsiung (陳澄雄)1991-2002
 Su Chung (蘇忠)2002-2005
 Ko Chi-liang (柯基良)2005-2007
 Liu Shuan-yung (劉玄詠)2007-2011; 2016 - present

Artistic Advisor  

 Lan Shui (水藍) 2011-2014
 Chien Wen-pin (簡文彬)2016-2016

Affiliates 
 NTSO Wind Ensemble
 NTSO Youth Band

See also 
 List of symphony orchestras in Taiwan

External links 

 National Taiwan Symphony Orchestra official site

1945 establishments in Taiwan
Musical groups established in 1945
Taiwanese orchestras